The 1996 United States presidential election in South Carolina took place on November 7, 1996, as part of the 1996 United States presidential election. Voters chose 8 representatives, or electors to the Electoral College, who voted for president and vice president.

South Carolina was won by Senator Bob Dole (R-KS), with Dole winning 49.89% to 43.85% over President Bill Clinton (D) by a margin of 6.04%. Billionaire businessman Ross Perot (Reform-TX) finished in third, with 5.6% of the popular vote.

This marked the first time that a Democratic nominee was elected twice without winning South Carolina either time. Once a Democratic bastion with a tiny all-white electorate, the state has moved towards the Republicans after their party was taken over by conservatives and Southerners in the 1980s and 1990s. No Democrat has won the state since 1976, and it is now considered one of the safest red states.

, this is the last election in which the following counties voted for a Democratic presidential candidate: Chesterfield, Georgetown, Abbeville, Lancaster, and Union.

Results

Results by county

Notes

References

South Carolina
1996
1996 South Carolina elections